Oenothera longissima is a species of flowering plant in the evening primrose family known by the common name longstem evening primrose. It is native to the southwestern United States, where it grows in relatively moist areas in scrub and woodland habitat. This is a biennial herb producing a tall, erect stem known to well exceed 2 meters in height. The widely lance-shaped leaves may be 22 centimeters in length and may have slight teeth along the edges. The inflorescence is a spike of showy large flowers. Each has yellow petals which may be more than 6 centimeters in length and fade orange or red with age. The fruit is a lance-shaped capsule up to 5.5 centimeters long.

External links
Jepson Manual Treatment

longissima
Night-blooming plants
Flora of the Southwestern United States